Perfect Baby is a 2011 Chinese romance film written and directed by Wang Jing and starring Deng Chao, Jane March, Jean-Baptiste Maunier, Annie Yi, and Liu Chenxi. The film premiered in China on August 25, 2011.

Plot
Emma, a French writer, is very talented and pretty. She wishes to have a baby, but not finding her great love, she decides to use in vitro fertilization. Lio Ma, son of a wealthy Chinese man, wants to be a dancer. He went to France to study. He goes to donate sperm with his classmate Alex. Emma uses the wrong sperm, which makes the child a mixed race. She takes Leo Ma and Alex to court.

Cast
 Deng Chao as Leo Ma, an overseas Chinese student in Paris.
 Jane March as Emma, a 38-year-old unmarried female writer. 
 Jean-Baptiste Maunier as Alex, Leo Ma's classmate.
 Annie Yi as Rose
 Liu Chenxi as Claire, a test tube baby, Leo Ma and Emma's daughter.
 Cheng Qian as Lee
 Clémence Saint-Preux as Amy, Leo Ma's girlfriend.

Production
This film was shot in Paris, capital of France. Jean-Jacques Annaud serves as its artist consultant.

Release
The film was released on August 25, 2011, in China.

References

External links
 
 
 

2011 films
English-language Chinese films
Chinese romance films
Films shot in Paris
Films set in Paris
2010s English-language films
2010s Mandarin-language films